The Foudroyant ("Lightning") was a  80-gun ship of the line of the French Navy.

She was started in Rochefort from 1793, and renamed to Dix-huit fructidor in 1798 in honour of the Coup of 18 fructidor an V, as she was still on keel. She was eventually launched as Foudroyant.

She took part in cruises in the Caribbean under Villaret de Joyeuse.

Anson, mistakenly believing Foudroyant distressed, attacked, and was driven off.

She took part in the Battle of the Basque Roads.

She was eventually broken up in 1834.

References

External links 
 Les bâtiments ayant porté le nom de Foudroyant
 1809 - Fouras (17) - La bataille des brûlots à bord du vaisseau "le Régulus"
 The French Navy in 1816

Ships of the line of the French Navy
Tonnant-class ships of the line
Ships built in France
1800 ships